Eduardo Orejuela (born 11 March 1952) is an Ecuadorian former swimmer. He competed in two events at the 1968 Summer Olympics.

References

1952 births
Living people
Ecuadorian male swimmers
Olympic swimmers of Ecuador
Swimmers at the 1968 Summer Olympics
Pan American Games competitors for Ecuador
Swimmers at the 1971 Pan American Games
Sportspeople from Guayaquil
20th-century Ecuadorian people